Francisco Manuel Barroso, Baron of Amazonas (September 29, 1804 in Lisbon – August 8, 1882 in Montevideo) was a respected and renowned Admiral of the Imperial Brazilian Navy. 

He was the commander who led the Imperial Navy to victory in the Battle of Riachuelo during the Paraguayan War. As a consequence of this victory, there was an expressive reduction in the Paraguayan naval capacity, and that nation, from then on, had to adopt defensive strategies until the end of the conflict.

Barroso was decorated with the Imperial Order of the Southern Cross and received the noble title of Baron of Amazonas in 1866, in honor of the flagship ship Amazonas that he commanded in the Battle of Riachuelo.

References

Brazilian military personnel of the Paraguayan War
1804 births
1882 deaths
Brazilian admirals